The National Conservative Party ( PCN) was a political party in Cuba. Between 1908 and 1932 the party participated in the national elections and won in the 1932 Cuban parliamentary election 25 of 69 seats.

References

Conservatism in Cuba
Defunct political parties in Cuba
Conservative parties in North America